USS Daisy was a tugboat acquired by the Union Navy during the American Civil War. She was used by the Navy to patrol navigable waterways of the Confederacy and to assist Union Navy ships requiring her towing services.

Service history
Mulford—a steam tugboat—was built in 1850 at Chicago, Illinois, and acquired by the War Department for use in the Mississippi River and its tributaries early in the Civil War. She was transferred to the Navy on 1 October 1862 and renamed Daisy on 24 October. Daisy served actively as a tug in the upper Mississippi River until the end of the war when she was taken to Mound City, Illinois. She was sold there on 17 August 1865.

References

External links
USS Daisy (1862-1865). Originally named Mulford

Ships of the Union Navy
Ships built in Chicago
Steamships of the United States Navy
Tugs of the United States Navy
American Civil War auxiliary ships of the United States
1850 ships